Prince Michał Gedeon Hieronim Radziwiłł (24 September 1778 – 24 May 1850) was a Polish–Lithuanian noble, senator, owner of the Nieborów and others properties.

Related to Radziwiłł family from Nieśwież (Dominik Hieronim Radziwiłł). He took part in the Kościuszko Uprising (1794). In January 1807 colonel and commander of the Legion-du-Nord, and later the 5th regiment of infantry (Duchy of Warsaw). He took part in the siege of Gdańsk, and was later stationed with his regiment in Gdańsk. In 1811 he was made general-de-brigade. In the campaign of 1812 he commanded the brigade of infantry in the “Polish division” of general Grandjean in the Jacques MacDonald’s 10th Army Corps. He took part in defense of Gdańsk in 1813 (under general Jean Rapp) and when fortress capitulated he was taken prisoner. In 1815 he resigned his commission and settled in Nieborów. In the 1830-31 November Uprising he was for some time Commander-in-Chief of the Polish forces and the Polish commander in the Battle of Grochów. After the failing of the uprising he was exiled to Yaroslavl in Russia. In 1836 returned to Poland, and died in Warsaw.

1778 births
1850 deaths
Nobility from Warsaw
Senators of Congress Poland
Polish commanders of the Napoleonic Wars
Michal Gedeon Radziwill
Generals of the November Uprising
Members of Polish government (November Uprising)
Military personnel from Warsaw